Pottuvil is a town in the Ampara District of Sri Lanka, located in the Eastern Province on the eastern coast of the Island.

Name
The romanized form Pothuwila and also Pothuvila are also common in English-language writings of Sinhalese writers, and in many webpages. Most sinhala newspaper articles and facebook pages refer to "Pothuvila", පොතුවිල.

History
This town is mentioned in the Pali Chronicle known as the Cūḷavaṃsa, and the Vanni Raajaavalaiya. "Bodhivāla" is mentioned in the Cūḷavaṃsa (Chapter lvii, 54) in the context of the Ruhuna (see: Principality of Ruhuna campaigns of Vijayabahu I, 11th century CE). Archaeologists like Ellawala Medhananda Thero, and historians have discussed the place name while Linguists recognize the change of "b" to "p" and the clear evolution of the modern name "Pothuvila" from Bodhivāla. "Vāla"  means "water" (or also periphery) in compound usage (Pali Text Society dict., p 610) as in "Aalavaala"(Sanskrit), i.e, basin of water found at the root of a tree. "vāla" is also a type of jasmine, Pavonia Odorata grown in temples. "Vaala" also means circumference or periphery (c.f., chakravaala), and "Bodhivaal" could simply mean the region enclosing a Bodhi (c.f. Devaala).

Pottuvil was affected by the 2004 Indian Ocean tsunami. The town's population in 2007 was 33,625.

Demographics 
Pottuvil is a Muslim dominant town. Tamils are the second largest group in the town. Others small groups, Sinhalese and Indian Tamils.

Ethnicity in Pottuvil Town (2012) 
Source:statistics.gov.lk

Economy
Agriculture is generally seen as the basic economic route of the town. In addition, the town’s internal economy is strengthened through animal husbandry, coastal and inland fisheries, small and medium business, tourism, and trade. It is evident that there are plenty of natural resources here. Paddy fields, forests, beaches, mountains and springs are parts of the town's landscape. Paddy is the main crop in the area. However, vegetables, coconuts and fruits are also grown and contribute to the internal livelihood. At the same time, animal husbandry and fisheries also contribute significantly to the economy, and the tourism sector is seen as one of the most important and well-developed sources.

The area is said to be rich in soil as it is home to beaches, rivers and reservoirs. Coconut cultivation is being carried out on a small scale in the coastal villages of Komari, Manarasena, Victor Garden, Hitayapuram, Urani and Ullai. In addition, chilli is the main crop in vegetable cultivation.

The city is also known for its beaches and the world-famous Arugam Bay for waterboarding. The nearby beaches are also known as Ullai Beach.

See also
 Pottuvil massacre
 Muhudu Maha Viharaya

Notes

References

Towns in Ampara District
Pottuvil DS Division